KTHV (channel 11) is a television station in Little Rock, Arkansas, United States, affiliated with CBS. The station is owned by Tegna Inc. and maintains studios on South Izard Street in downtown Little Rock and a transmitter atop Shinall Mountain, near the Chenal Valley section of the city.

History
The station first signed on the air on November 27, 1955; it was originally owned by the Arkansas Television Company, a consortium that included among others, the owners of radio station KWKH in Shreveport, the owners of the Arkansas Democrat, and Little Rock businessman and insurance executive Clyde E. Lowry. The KTHV call letters were derived from former sister radio station KTHS (whose calls stood for "Kome To Hot Springs), which later became KAAY after being sold to LIN Broadcasting in the 1960s. It took the CBS affiliation from KATV, due to KTHS' long time affiliation with CBS Radio.

The station has operated from its downtown Little Rock studios at 720 Izard Street since its debut; the facilities were built one year before KTHV signed on, in 1954 (and a year after KTHS moved its city of license from Hot Springs to Little Rock), and was the first broadcasting facility in Arkansas to be constructed for both radio and television. KTHV's studios were located on the first floor of the building, while the studios housing KTHS were located on the second floor. Although the interior of the building has been periodically upgraded, especially with improved technology, the exterior of the station remains much as it appeared when it was built. For many years, KTHV had operated a low-power translator station, K13HP (channel 13) in Euclid Heights, near Hot Springs. The station's analog transmitter was shut down in 2009, and no digital translator was installed to replace it.

KTHV remained a locally owned entity until December 1994, when the station was acquired by the Gannett Company in an all-stock transaction. Gannett's purchase of KTHV marked a re-entry into the Little Rock–Pine Bluff television market for the company, which previously had owned NBC affiliate KARK-TV (channel 4) from when Gannett merged with Combined Communications Corporation in 1978 until it was sold to Southwest Media in 1983. The purchase of KTHV was believed to be positioning on Gannett's part to have a station in the former home of then first-term President Bill Clinton.

The station branded for years as "Arkansas 11" until November 1995, when it rebranded as "Today's THV," a branding that may have been inspired by Journal Broadcast Group's Milwaukee flagship station and NBC affiliate WTMJ-TV, which itself has branded as "Today's TMJ4" (a branding inspired by the common viewer nickname for the station, "TMJ", in reference to founding owners The Milwaukee Journal) since July 1992. Unlike that station or WTMJ's Boise sister station KIVI-TV (which brands as either "Today's Channel 6" or "Today's 6"), the station branded simply as "Today's THV", omitting verbal references to its VHF channel 11 allocation, although a stylized "11" was included in the station's logo. The station's branding was amended (along with the introduction of a new logo) on February 28, 2013, being revised to "THV 11".

On March 1, 1997, KTHV chief meteorologist Ed Buckner went on the air to cover a significant tornado outbreak that caused damage to much of Arkansas, and produced two destructive F4 tornadoes (out of three that touched down in the state that day): one that touched down near Beirne and struck Arkadelphia, and another that hit the southern and eastern suburbs of Little Rock (causing severe damage in Benton). The outbreak, which produced 19 tornadoes that day, killed 26 people, although it is believed that the death toll would have been much higher without the advance warning provided by Buckner and the rest of the KTHV weather staff.

In 2002, KTHV became the first television station in the Little Rock market to erect a digital antenna and the first to broadcast a digital television signal.

Around the first week of October 2012, Gannett entered a dispute against Dish Network regarding compensation fees and Dish's AutoHop commercial-skip feature on its Hopper digital video recorders. Gannett ordered that Dish discontinue AutoHop on the account that it is affecting advertising revenues for KTHV. Gannett threatened to pull all of its stations (such as KTHV) should the skirmish continue beyond October 7 and Dish and Gannett fail to reach an agreement. The two parties eventually reached an agreement after extending the deadline for a few hours.

On June 29, 2015, Gannett's broadcasting division split from the newspaper division and renamed its broadcasting and digital divisions under the Tegna name (KTHV was included in the transaction to Tegna).

Programming
While KTHV airs CBS network programming in pattern, the station airs one hour of the CBS Dream Team block (which typically airs on Saturday mornings), on Sundays from 7 to 8 a.m. Syndicated programs broadcast on KTHV include Dr. Phil and Access Hollywood .

News operation

KTHV presently broadcasts 26½ hours of locally produced newscasts each week (with 4½ hours each weekday, three hours on Saturdays and one hour on Sundays). Weather segments during the station's newscasts are typically presented in the "Weather Garden," a courtyard studio located directly outside the station's Izard Street facility, that includes a chroma key wall to display graphics overlaid in the control room and a robotic camera. Weather updates during CBS Mornings and on "THV11 WeatherNation" are done from a chroma key wall inside the weather center. The concept was inspired by Tegna-owned sister station and NBC affiliate KUSA in Denver, which also conducts its forecasts in a courtyard outside of the station's studios.

On April 6, 2009, KTHV expanded its 6 p.m. newscast to one hour with the addition of a half-hour newscast at 6:30 p.m.; as such, it became the only news-producing station in the market to air a newscast during the 6:30 half-hour. On April 3, 2010, the station debuted a two-hour Saturday morning newscast from 6 to 8 a.m. (the Saturday edition of The Early Show [which has since evolved into CBS Saturday Morning] was pushed one hour later in order to accommodate the newscast; the newscast competes against KATV's Saturday edition of Channel 7 News Daybreak, which had been the only weekend morning newscast in the market prior to the program's launch).

On September 13, 2010, KTHV moved its weekday morning newscast to 4:30 a.m., expanding it to 2½ hours and becoming the first television station in Arkansas to start its weekday morning newscast before 5 a.m. On December 19, 2010, beginning with the 10 p.m. newscast, KTHV became the first television station in the Little Rock market and the state of Arkansas to begin broadcasting its local newscasts in high definition (KTHV had already been broadcasting some syndicated programming such as Dr. Phil , as well as CBS network programming in HD). The station unveiled a standardized graphics package that was being rolled out to all Gannett stations as part of an on-air revamp on February 28, 2013 (coinciding with the rebranding to "THV 11"), which included color coding for various content categories based on that used by then-co-owned newspaper USA Today.

Notable former on-air staff
 Alyse Eady – anchor (now at WAGA-TV in Atlanta)
 TJ Holmes – anchor/reporter (2000–2003; later at CNN, now with ABC News)
 B. J. Sams – anchor (1982–2009)

Technical information

Subchannels
The station's digital signal is multiplexed:

Analog-to-digital conversion
KTHV shut down its analog signal, over VHF, channel 11, on June 12, 2009, the official date in which full-power television stations in the United States transitioned from analog to digital broadcasts under federal mandate. The station's digital signal remained on its pre-transition VHF channel 12. Through the use of PSIP, digital television receivers display the station's virtual channel as its former VHF analog channel 11.

As part of the SAFER Act, KTHV kept its analog signal on the air until June 27 to inform viewers of the digital television transition through a loop of public service announcements from the National Association of Broadcasters.

Out-of-market coverage
KTHV, along with Memphis-based WREG-TV previously served as the default CBS affiliate for the Jonesboro, Arkansas media market. Both KTHV and WREG were available on Suddenlink cable, as well as the cable system of Paragould Light Water and Cable in the Paragould area. KTHV was removed on September 1, 2015 from Suddenlink and was replaced by KJNB-LD's DT2 subchannel. However, WREG remains on Jonesboro's Suddenlink lineup.

References

External links
Official website

THV
CBS network affiliates
Antenna TV affiliates
True Crime Network affiliates
Quest (American TV network) affiliates
Circle (TV network) affiliates
Twist (TV network) affiliates
Scripps News affiliates
Tegna Inc.
Television channels and stations established in 1955
1955 establishments in Arkansas
Former Gannett subsidiaries